James Frederick Arnold (2 March 1869 – 26 March 1944) was an English cricketer who played three first-class matches for  Lancashire County Cricket Club in the 1896 season.

References

1869 births
1944 deaths
English cricketers
Lancashire cricketers
People from Withington